Anredera cordifolia, commonly known as the Madeira-vine or mignonette vine, is a South American species of ornamental succulent vine of the family Basellaceae. The combination of fleshy leaves and thick aerial tubers makes this a very heavy vine. It smothers trees and other vegetation it grows on and can easily break branches and bring down entire trees on its own.

Description

Anredera cordifolia is an evergreen climber that grows from fleshy rhizomes. It has bright green, heart-shaped, fleshy shiny leaves 4–13 cm long. Wart-like tubers are produced on aerial stems and are a key to identifying the plant.

The plant spreads via the tubers, which detach very easily.

Reproduction
Anredera cordifolia can reproduce through the proliferation of tubers and also from rhizome fragments that may be broken off. Although this species has both male and female flowers they rarely reproduce sexually and produce seed. This species often spreads through its own vegetative growth, but can easily be transported by human activities. If fragments end up in waterways, they are easily transported to new locations in this manner.

Seedlings were found well away from habitation, roads and streams in Australia from 1988 onwards, leading to the conclusion that the species produces seeds there.

Range
It is native to Bolivia, Brazil, Paraguay, Uruguay and Argentina in South America. It has been introduced to Africa, the Australasia–Pacific region, southern Europe, and North America; it is considered an invasive species in many tropical and sub-tropical localities.

Uses

The leaves of the Madeira vine can be cooked as a vegetable by frying with olive oil or sesame oil and garlic, and can be used in soups. The leaves and as well the stems can be eaten raw and as well as boiled. Its rhizomes are also edible. The bulbils are inedible but have been used medicinally to reduce inflammation, ameliorate ulcers and assist the liver.

Nutrients
The leaves are rich in beta-carotene, vitamin E and calcium, in addition to having small amounts of riboflavin, folic acid, ascorbic acid, iron and protein. The leaves also contain mucilage.

Invasiveness

Madeira vine can climb 40 m into the tree canopy, smothering and collapsing mature trees. It is listed on the New Zealand National Pest Plant Accord, which limits its cultivation and sale. The Australian Weeds Committee published a Draft Madeira Vine Strategy in August 2012, which is aimed at preventing the spread and reducing the impacts of this vine throughout Australia.

Control
Mature vines are controlled using the "scrape and paint" method, where the bark is scraped to expose the cambium layer and painted with herbicide. Follow-up three times a year or more is required. Controlling Madeira vine requires exhaustion of the tuber bank. Foliar spraying of glyphosate 360g/L at 1% concentration can manage prostrate growth and newly emerged vines.

References

Further reading
 
 Invasive Species Specialist Group (ISSG). Anredera cordifolia

External links
Anredera cordifolia Plants For A Future database
Anredera cordifolia (Ten.) Steenis Medicinal Plant Images Database (School of Chinese Medicine, Hong Kong Baptist University)  

Basellaceae
Tubers
Flora of Brazil
Garden plants of South America
Vines
Flora of Malta
Invasive plant species in Australia
Leaf vegetables
Perennial vegetables
Root vegetables